Phytoecia tekensis is a species of beetle in the family Cerambycidae. It was described by Semenov in 1896. It is known from Iran.

References

Phytoecia
Beetles described in 1896